This is a list of the current members of the National Assembly of Gabon

1 AKOGHET Gisèle (PDG)
2 ANGANGOU Estelle Flore (PDG)
3 ANGARA Alphonse (PDG)
4 ANGO NDOUTOUME François (PDG)
5 ANGOUE Samuel (PDG)
6 ANGWE ABOUGHE André (PDG)
7 AZIZET Berthe (PDG)
8 BAL’ABONDHOUME Irène Farelle épse KOUNDE (PDG)
9 Alexandré Barro Chambrier(PDG)
10 BAYOGHA NEMBE Célestin (PDG)
11 André Dieudonné Berre (PDG)
12 BIE EYENE Paul (PDG)
13 BINET Modeste (PDG)
14 Paul Biyoghé Mba (PDG)
15 BIYOGHE BI-NZUE Nicaise (PDG)
16 BOUKILA Jean Pierre (PDG)
17 Faustin Boukoubi (PDG)
18 BOUNGOUERES Alain Simplice (PDG)
19 BOUTAMBA MBINA Alexis (PDG)
20 DOUPAMBY MATOKA Marcel (PDG)
21 EDZEBA-BICKE Steve Thierry (PDG)
22 ELLA MENIE Vincent de Paul (PDG)
23 ESSIE EMANE Paul (PDG)
24 EYAMBA TSIMAT Maurice Nestor (PDG)
25 Vincent de Paul Gondjout (PDG)
26 IDOUNDOU Emmanuel (PDG)
27 IGNOUMBA Jonathan (PDG)
28 INDOUMOU MAMBOUNGOU Barnabé (PDG)
29 IVALA Clotaire Christian (PDG)
103 KAH Gervais Landry (PDG)
30 KOUMBA TENGO Bruce (PDG)
31 LATE Emmanuel (PDG)
32 LENGOMAS MATOMBI Gilbert (PDG)
33 MABALA Martin (PDG)  
34 MAGANGA MANFOUMBI Justin (PDG)
35 MAGANGA MOUSSAVOU Albertine (PDG)
36 MAKUNGU Alain Patrick (PDG)
37 MALONGA-MOUELET Gabriel (PDG)
38 Luc Marat Abyla(PDG)
39 MASSALA TSAMBA Narcisse (PDG)
40 MASSIMA Jean (PDG)
41 MAVOUNGOU BOUYOU Vincent (PDG)
42 MAWOBO LENDOYE Fernando (PDG)
43 Paul Mba Abessole (RPG)
44 MBADINGA MOMBO Ferdinand (PDG)
45 MBONDZI Solange (PDG)
46 MBOUMBA Joseph (PDG)
47 MBOUMBOU MIYAKOU Edgard Anicet (PDG)
48 MBOUMI Michel (PDG)
49 MBOUMI NZINZI Jean Claude (PDG)
50 MENGA M’ESSONE Michel (PDG)
51 MIKANGA SEMBA Philippe Romain (PDG)
52 MOMOADJAMBO Sylvain (PDG)
53 MOUBAMBA MOUKETOU Aloïse (PDG)
54 MOUDOUMA Apollinaire Adonis (PDG)
55 MOULENGUI MABENDE Martin (PDG)
56 MOUNGUENGUI KOUMBA Guy François (PDG)
57 MOUSSAVOU Louis Marie (PDG)
58 MOUTSINGA Juliette (PDG/PGCI)
59 MPONO Jean Claude (PDG)
60 Marcellin Mve Ebang (PDG)
61 NANG NDONG Paul (PDG)
62 NDAKI Bernabé (PDG)
63 NDEKAYINO Marguerite  (PDG)
64 NDEMEZO’O OBIANG René (PDG)
65 NDJAMONO François (PDG)
66 NDJAVE NDJOY Albert (PDG)
67 NDONG NGUEMA Paul (PDG)
68 NDONG OBIANG Albert (PDG)
69 NDOUTOUME ESSONE Jean Marie (PDG)
70 NDZIAMI Jacques (PDG)
71 NDZOUMBA Bernard (PDG)
72 Idriss Ngari (PDG)
73 Angélique Ngoma (PDG)
74 NGOMBELA Raymond (PDG)
75 NGONDJIGA Ludovic (PDG)
76 NGOU-MVE Nicolas (PDG)
77 NGOZO ISSONDOU Maxime-Laurent (PDG)
78 NGUEMA ESSONO Jacques (PDG)
79 NGUEMA MBA Alexandre (PDG)
80 NGUEMA NDONG Jean Marie (RPG)
81 NGUIMBI André Christ (PDG)
82 NKERO MOUGNOKO Charlotte (PDG)
83 NKOGHE ESSINGONE Adrien (PDG)
84 NONGOU MOUNDOUNGA Pauline Olive épse LOUEMBET (PDG)
85 NTIMEDJIARA Rachel (PDG)
86 NTOLO EYA’A Francis (PDG)
87 NTOUTOUME MEBIAME Aurélien (PDG)
88 NTOUTOUME Robert (PDG)
89 NYINGONE ANDA Marie-Madeleine (RPG)
90 NZE-MOUENIDIAMBOU Joséphine (PDG)
91 NZENGUE MAYILA Philippe (PDG)
92 NZIENGUI MIHINDOU (CLR)
93 Guy Nzouba-Ndama (PDG)
94 OBAME ONDO Jean Marie (PDG)
95 OGOUEBANDJA OGOUEMPONO Jules Marius (PDG)
96 OGOULA Philomène (PDG)
97 ONDIMBA Maxime (PDG)
98 Richard Auguste Onouviet (PDG) - President of the Assembly
99 ONTSOUGOU Faustin (PDG)
100 OSSAGOU Guy Christian (PDG)
101 OTANDO Charles (PDG)
102 OWONO NDONG Edgard (PDG)
104 PAÏENI Paulette épse KOHO (PDG)
105 RETENO André Jules (PDG)
106 ROYEMBO Albert Richard (PDG)
107 SIMEPOUNGOU Jean Claude (PDG)
108 SYLONG Jean Richard (PDG)
109 TALI Nicolas (PDG)
110 Paul Toungui (PDG)
111 YAMI Laurent (PDG)
112 YOUBANGOYE MBILA Alexandre (PDG)
113 ZIBI ABEGHE Bertrand (PDG)
114 ZOUGA AKI Esther (PDG)

External links
Website of the National Assembly
List of members

Gabon
Government of Gabon
Gabon, National Assembly